Thomas or Tom Latham may refer to:

Tom Latham (politician) (born 1948), United States politician
Tom Latham (cricketer) (born 1992), New Zealand cricketer
Thomas Latham (cricketer) (1847–1926), English barrister and cricketer
Thomas Latham (MP) for Westminster (UK Parliament constituency) in 1654
Thomas J. Latham (1831–1911), American lawyer and businessman